ET Canada (previously referred to as Entertainment Tonight Canada) is a Canadian entertainment news television series, using the same format as the American entertainment newsmagazine Entertainment Tonight. ET Canada is a broadcast show that airs back-to-back with the American version on most of Global's stations.

ET Canada is hosted by longtime Global Toronto entertainment host Cheryl Hickey and presented by reporters Roz Weston, Sangita Patel, Carlos Bustamante and Keshia Chanté.

ETC Live is an online show in connection with ET Canada, that airs weekdays via Facebook and YouTube, shot live with expanded coverage of entertainment news. It is an interactive show, allowing viewers to submit commentary as Weston, Chanté and Graeme O'Neil debate topics.

In 2021, Global announced the launch of a weekend edition of ET Canada; this version aired on Saturdays with host Sangita Patel and premiered on 18 September 2021. The weekend edition wasn't renewed for a second season.

On-air staff

Current on-air staff
 Cheryl Hickey (2005–present)
 Sangita Patel (2013–present)
 Carlos Bustamante (2017–present)
 Keshia Chanté (2018–present)
 Brittnee Blair (2022–present)
 Jed Tavernier (2022–present)

Previous on-air staff
 Rick Campanelli (2005–2017)
 Roz Weston (2005–2022)

Reception
The show was nominated for a Gemini Award in the best general interest series category in 2006.

Spin-offs

The show has also added three spin-off shows and an annual special. ET Canada: Behind the Scenes gives viewers a peek behind the curtain, showcasing the team behind the brand. There have been two installments to date, the first highlighting the Toronto International Film Festival, debuted in October 2011. The second brought fans to the Grammy Awards, and documented the last minute-changes to the live red carpet show, in the wake of Whitney Houston's shocking sudden death.

ET Canada: Conversations highlights major international stars in extended long form interviews. The premiere episode featured Michael Bublé and aired in December 2011. Since then, One Direction, Coldplay, Katy Perry, Nickelback, Kylie Minogue, and Carrie Underwood have all been subjects.

From 2008 through 2015, Global produced coverage of New Year's Eve festivities from Queen Victoria Park and the Skylon Tower in Niagara Falls, Ontario, co-branded as the ET Canada New Year's Eve Bash. The special was previously a local broadcast on Hamilton's CHCH prior to its sale to Channel Zero, and was expanded and re-positioned as a network special. The last telecast aired in 2015.

In June 2016, the show began infrequent additional live episodes on Facebook. On September 12, 2016, ET Canada Live began its daily broadcast online and on Global. Similar to Access Hollywood Live and TMZ Live, the show is shot during the afternoon in-studio and features viewer interaction.

In 2017, ET Canada launched ETC Live an online show that airs live weekdays on Facebook and Youtube with an expanded coverage of entertainment news. Often hosted by Roz Weston, Graeme O'Neil and Keshia Chanté.

Producer Stephen Krajinovic, known on-air as Dallas Dixon, also hosts ET Canada Pride, a digital series on LGBTQ-oriented entertainment news, while Morgan Hoffman hosts Royal Rewind, a digital series reporting news involving the British royal family. Both ET Canada Pride and Royal Rewind received Canadian Screen Award nominations for Best Web Program or Series, Nonfiction at the 10th Canadian Screen Awards in 2022.

In 2021, the series also produced Artists & Icons: Indigenous Entertainers in Canada, a special episode devoted to highlighting the achievements of indigenous actors and musicians working in Canadian entertainment, to mark the National Day of Truth and Reconciliation. The special also received two CSA nominations in 2021, for Best Talk Program or Series and Best Direction, Lifestyle or Information (Ryan Carter).

References

External links
 
 

Global Television Network original programming
Television series by CBS Studios
Television series by Corus Entertainment
Television shows filmed in Toronto
Entertainment news shows in Canada
2000s Canadian television news shows
2005 Canadian television series debuts
Canadian television series based on American television series
2010s Canadian television news shows